Elvis Geovany Scott Ruiz (born 1 August 1978 in Puerto Cortés) is a Honduran former football striker who last played for Guatemalan side Juventud Retalteca.

Club career
Scott started his career at hometown club Platense before spells at several different teams in the Honduran National League. He also had a season, the 2003 Clausura, in El Salvador with Alianza. He was bought by the Chinese club Changchun Yatai in December 2005, along with his teammate Victor Mena and Olimpia player Samuel Caballero. He returned to Honduras in summer 2009 and was snapped up by Marathón just in time for the 2009 Apertura.

He joined Necaxa from Platense for the 2010 Apertura season but claiming the club owed him money he left them and he returned to Platense in August 2011, but he moved abroad again to play for Guatemalan side Juventud Retalteca in January 2012. In June 2012 he returned to Platense to seal another contract with the club.

Club career stats
Last update: 31 July 2009

International career
He was a member of Honduras' squad at the 2000 Summer Olympics in Sydney.

Scott made his senior debut for Honduras in an August 2000 friendly match against Haiti and has earned a total of 2 caps, scoring 1 goal. His second and final international was a February 2006 friendly match against China.

International goals

References

External links

 Player profile 
 List of Motagua goalscorers of all-time

1978 births
Living people
People from Puerto Cortés
Association football forwards
Honduran footballers
Honduras international footballers
Olympic footballers of Honduras
Footballers at the 2000 Summer Olympics
Platense F.C. players
C.D. Olimpia players
C.D. Marathón players
Alianza F.C. footballers
Hispano players
F.C. Motagua players
Changchun Yatai F.C. players
Beijing Guoan F.C. players
Chinese Super League players
Liga Nacional de Fútbol Profesional de Honduras players
Honduran expatriate footballers
Honduran expatriate sportspeople in El Salvador
Honduran expatriate sportspeople in Guatemala
Expatriate footballers in El Salvador
Expatriate footballers in China
Expatriate footballers in Guatemala
Honduran expatriate sportspeople in China